Chengdu–Pujiang intercity railway, also known as the Cheng-Pu Express Railway, is a regional railway operated by China Railway High-speed within Sichuan province. It will connect the provincial capital of Chengdu with south-western cities along the western edge of the Sichuan Basin to Pujiang. It will start at Chengdu West railway station and will terminate and connect with the planned Chengdu–Ya'an railway at Chaoyanghu railway station. Construction and management of this line has been conducted by a joint venture limited liability company between Chengdu Metro and China Railway Chengdu Group.

Profile
Chengdu–Pujiang intercity railway begins in Chengdu at Chengdu West railway station, branching off the Chengdu Ring Railway to travel westwards via Wenjiang, Chongzhou, Dayi County, Qionglai and Pujiang County. Preliminary land acquisition and demolition work was carried out by the end of 2012, allowing for construction to begin. There is a total of 12 railway stations, Chengdu West, Shuangliu North, Wenjiang (elevated), Yangma, Chongzhou (elevated), Longxing, Dayi (elevated), Wangsizhen, Qionglai (elevated), Xilai, Pujiang and Chaoyanghu. The line is start to operated on December 28, 2018.

Chaoyanghu will also be served by the planned Chengdu–Ya'an railway.

References

High-speed railway lines in China
Standard gauge railways in China
Rail transport in Sichuan
Transport in Chengdu